Jerry J. Wing (June 21, 1923 – July 18, 1994) was an American businessman and politician.

Born in Appleton, Wisconsin, Wing served in the United States Army Air Forces during World War II. He was President of the W.B. Bottle Supply Company in Milwaukee, Wisconsin, retiring in 1988. In 1969, Wing served in the Wisconsin State Assembly as a Republican. He cast a key vote on the state budget that year after previously siding with the Democrats to stall the measure. Later, Wing became an Independent. He had lived in West Allis, Wisconsin. He died in Naples, Florida.

Notes

External links
W.B. Bottle Supply Company-Information about the company and Jerry Wing

1923 births
1994 deaths
Politicians from Appleton, Wisconsin
People from West Allis, Wisconsin
United States Army Air Forces personnel of World War II
Military personnel from Wisconsin
Businesspeople from Wisconsin
Wisconsin Independents
20th-century American businesspeople
20th-century American politicians
Republican Party members of the Wisconsin State Assembly